The South Main Street Apartments Historic District encompasses a pair of identical Colonial Revival apartment houses at 2209 and 2213 Main Street in Little Rock, Arkansas.  Both are two-story four-unit buildings, finished in a brick veneer and topped by a dormered hip roof.  They were built in 1941, and are among the first buildings in the city to be built with funding assistance from the Federal Housing Administration.  They were designed by the Little Rock firm of Bruggeman, Swaim & Allen.

The district was listed on the National Register of Historic Places in 1995.

See also
National Register of Historic Places listings in Little Rock, Arkansas

References

Houses on the National Register of Historic Places in Arkansas
Colonial Revival architecture in Arkansas
Buildings and structures completed in 1941
Houses in Little Rock, Arkansas
National Register of Historic Places in Little Rock, Arkansas
Historic district contributing properties in Arkansas